Armando Hernández may refer to:

 Armando Hernández (actor), Mexican television and film actor
 Armando Rangel Hernández (born 1965), Mexican politician